Jilke Deconinck (born 9 January 1995) is a Belgian footballer who plays in the midfield of the Belgian football club Eendracht Aalst.

Club career
Deconick made his debut on 29 September 2013 at the 9th matchday of the season in the Jupiler Pro League. Cercle lost the home match with 0–5 against leader Standard. Deconick substituted Gaël Etock after 81 minutes. One week later again he came in the field after a substitution in the won away game against KV Mechelen.

References

1995 births
Footballers from Ghent
Living people
Association football midfielders
Belgian footballers
Cercle Brugge K.S.V. players
S.C. Eendracht Aalst players
Belgian Pro League players
Flemish sportspeople